Mário Torres (13 September 1931 – 4 June 2020) was Portuguese footballer who played as a midfielder.

Football career 

Torres gained 5 caps for Portugal and made his debut 22 December 1957 in Milan against Italy, in a 0–3 defeat.

References

External links
 
 

1931 births
2020 deaths
Portuguese footballers
Association football midfielders
Primeira Liga players
Associação Académica de Coimbra – O.A.F. players
Portugal international footballers
People from Huambo